Vitaliy Pavlovich Khotsenko (born 18 March 1986) is a Ukrainian-born Russian politician, who served as Prime Minister of the Donetsk People's Republic in 2022. He had previously held several statewide positions in Stavropol Krai and the Yamalo-Nenets Autonomous Okrug.

Biography

Early life 
Khotsenko was born on 18 March 1986 in Dnipropetrovsk (now known as Dnipro). His father, Pavel Vitalyevich Khotsenko, led the Organized Crime department of the Ministry of Internal Affairs in Yamalo-Nenets Autonomous Okrug. In addition, he led the directorate of a hotel complex in Novy Urengoy and of the Sochi National Park.   

Khotsenko graduated from the Faculty of Sociology in Moscow State University, from the Singapore Institute of Marketing with a degree in Business Management and from the Specialized Institute of Jurisprudence with a degree in the field. He also graduated from the Russian Presidential Academy of National Economy and Public Administration with a master's degree in State regulation of the Economy, as well as postgraduate studies at Moscow State University. After training in the military department of Moscow State University, Khotsenko attained the rank of Lieutenant. He is also fluent in English.

Political career 
Khotsenko first worked as an assistant to a member of the Civic Chamber of the Russian Federation. According to local media, his rapid promotion was related to his father's connections in the Yamalo-Nenets Autonomous Okrug. From 2008 to 2010, Khotsenko worked as the head of the analysis and forecasting department of the Yamalo-Nenets Okrug. From March of 2010, he worked as the Director of the department of Science and Innovation in the Okrug, as an assistant, as the expert adviser to the Okrug's first deputy governor, and as a supervisor of Industry, Fuel, Energy, and Natural Resources.

On 16 December 2013, Khotsenko was appointed Minister of Energy, Industry and Communications of Stavropol Krai. On September 12, 2019, Khotsenko became the Director of the Department of Industrial Policy and Project Management in the Russian Ministry of Industry and Trade.

On 8 June 2022, the People's Council of the Donetsk People's Republic approved Khotsenko's candidacy for the position of Prime Minister of the Donetsk People's Republic. That day, Khotsenko was appointed to the position by the Head of the Donetsk People's Republic, Denis Pushilin.

On 21 December 2022, Khotsenko was injured by shelling along with Dmitry Rogozin in Donetsk; the attack killed two people according to DPR head Denis Pushilin, while Ukraine's border service confirmed that the Ukrainian military were behind the attack.

References 

1986 births
Living people
Politicians from Dnipro
People of the Donetsk People's Republic
Pro-Russian people of the war in Donbas
Russian politicians